The Agricultural Marketing Act of 1929, under the administration of Herbert Hoover, established the Federal Farm Board from the Federal Farm Loan Board established by the Federal Farm Loan Act of 1916 with a revolving fund of half a billion dollars. The original act was sponsored by Hoover in an attempt to stop the downward spiral of crop prices by seeking to buy, sell and store agricultural surpluses or by generously lending money to farm organizations. Money was lent out to the farmers in order to buy seed and food for the livestock, which was especially important since there had previously been a drought in the Democratic South. However, Hoover refused to lend to the farmers themselves, as he thought that it would be unconstitutional to do so and if they were lent money, they would become dependent on government money.

Effects
The Federal Farm Board's purchase of surplus could not keep up with the production; as farmers realized that they could just sell the government their crops, they reimplemented the use of fertilizers and other techniques to increase production. Overall, the deflation could not be countered because of a massive fault in the bill: there was no production limit. Had there been a production limit, the deflation might have been helped somewhat. The funds appropriated were eventually exhausted and the losses of the farmers kept rising.

The H.R. 1 legislation was passed by the 71st Congressional session and enacted by the 31st President of the United States Herbert Hoover on June 15, 1929.

The Act was the precursor to the Agricultural Adjustment Act.

References

External links
 
 

United States federal agriculture legislation
1929 in American law
Agricultural marketing in the United States